"Ignite" (stylized as "IGNITE") is a single by Japanese singer Eir Aoi. It was released under SME Records on August 20, 2014. It was used as the first opening theme of the Sword Art Online II anime television series. It reached number one on the Billboard Japan Hot 100, and also reached the ninth place on the weekly Oricon Singles Chart. It also received a digital download song certification of Platinum from the Recording Industry Association of Japan for sales of 250,000.

Track listing

Charts

Certifications

Release history

References

External links 
 
 

2014 singles
2014 songs
Eir Aoi songs
Billboard Japan Hot 100 number-one singles
Anime songs
SME Records singles
Sword Art Online